Andrea Minucci (died 1572) was a Roman Catholic prelate who served as Archbishop of Zadar (1567–1572).

On 5 December 1567, Minucci was appointed during the papacy of Pope Pius V as Archbishop of Zadar. On 15 February 1568, he was consecrated bishop by Giulio Antonio Santorio, Archbishop of Santa Severina, with Girolamo Savorgnano, Bishop of Šibenik, and Galeazzo Gegald, Bishop Emeritus of Bagnoregio, serving as co-consecrators. He served as Archbishop of Zadar until his death in 1572.

References

External links and additional sources
 (for Chronology of Bishops) 
 (for Chronology of Bishops) 

16th-century Roman Catholic bishops in Croatia
Bishops appointed by Pope Pius V
1572 deaths